Polanco is a neighborhood in the Miguel Hidalgo borough of Mexico City. Polanco is an affluent colonia, noted for its luxury shopping along Presidente Masaryk Avenue, the most expensive street in Mexico, as well as for the numerous prominent cultural institutions located within the neighborhood.

Originally a residential area of large single-family homes, the land use of the neighborhood began to change in the second half of the 20th century. Particularly after the 1985 Mexico City earthquake, the former residences were replaced by commercial properties and high rise buildings. Today, Polanco is best known as a shopping district.

Polanco is often called the "Beverly Hills of Mexico", having one of the country's densest concentrations of luxury shopping, with the most upscale restaurants, high-net-worth individuals, upscale hotels, and diplomatic missions and embassies. It is one of the most expensive real estate markets in Latin America.

A newer development north of Polanco, popularly termed "Nuevo Polanco", is a business district that is home to BBVA, WeWork and Telecel  which also houses important cultural institutions such as the Museo Soumaya and the Colección Jumex. Nuevo Polanco, officially in the colonias of Granada and Ampliación Granada, is not part of the Polanco neighborhood. However, Polanco and Nuevo Polanco are frequently grouped together.

History

The colonia takes its name from a river that crossed what is now the Avenue Campos Elisios (Champs Elysees/Elysian Fields), named in memory of the Spanish Jesuit Juan Alfonso de Polanco, a secretary of Ignatius of Loyola, whose relatives, members of the Polanco family, were members of board of the Kings of Spain in the 17th century and came to Mexico as officers of the Crown.

In a plan made by Francisco Antonio de Guerrero y Torres and dated 1784, a "ruined house Polanco" is located on the grounds of the Hacienda de San Juan de los Morales. This hacienda sits on land donated in the sixteenth century to Hernán Cortés by the King of Spain, under the jurisdiction of Tacuba. At the beginning of the colonial times, parts of this land (near the current center of the Hacienda) were occupied for planting mulberry trees for breeding silkworms (hence the name "los morales"). The hull of the Hacienda as currently known dates from the eighteenth century. Extension lands belonging to the estate began to be divided in the late 1920s.

Polanco was developed in 1937 by the Aleman family, the same developers of Ciudad Satélite and San José Insurgentes districts, on the land that was originally the Hacienda de los Morales, just north of Molino del Rey town and Bosque de Chapultepec. The first area to be built is now called Polanco Reforma and lies just north of Paseo de la Reforma, the entrance to the new neighborhood marked by a tile obelisk facing Reforma. In those days, there were only mansions surrounded by gardens and tree lined streets.

By the 1960s, the first department store arrived in the neighborhood, forever transforming the face of Polanco. In the 1970s, the last piece of land to be developed was sold, the triangle of Ejército Nacional, Ferrocarril de Cuernavaca and Periférico, where no stand-alone housing was built, only apartment buildings.

The 1985 Mexico City earthquake reshaped the city layout, and Polanco was no exception; restaurants, embassies, boutiques and corporate business slowly moved from Zona Rosa and established themselves in Polanco. Big houses were torn down and replaced with new buildings. The former inhabitants typically moved to neighborhoods such as Bosques de las Lomas and Lomas de Tecamachalco.

Land prices have become some of the most expensive in the city, as zoning rules forbid skyscrapers in the area. There are few mansions remaining which are protected by INBA, therefore large building projects cannot be undertaken like the ones in Lomas de Chapultepec, or Santa Fe, two areas which have an edge on attracting new inhabitants. Ruben Darío Avenue, facing Chapultepec Park, and Campos Eliseos Avenue are two of the most expensive streets in Mexico City, with apartments ranging up to $15 million.

Geography

Polanco consists of five officially recognized colonias, called "Polanco I Sección", "Polanco II Sección", "Polanco III Sección", "Polanco IV Sección", and "Polanco V Sección".

The borders of Polanco are:
 On the north, Avenida Ejército Nacional and the Nuevo Polanco area as well as Colonia Irrigación
 On the south, Paseo de la Reforma
 On the east, Avenida General Mariano Escobedo and Colonia Anzures
 On the west, Blvd. Manuel Ávila Camacho (Anillo Periférico) and the colonias of Lomas de Chapultepec, Reforma Social and Residencia Militar

Formerly Polanco contained nine colonias whose names were: Bosque de Chapultepec, Bosque de Chapultepec Polanco, Chapultepec Morales, Chapultepec Polanco, Los Morales - Sección Palmas, Los Morales - Sección Alameda, Polanco Reforma, Polanco Chapultepec, and Rincón del Bosque.

Polanquito, between Parque Lincoln and Avenida Masaryk, consists of a three by three block pedestrian-friendly area with wall-to-wall restaurants and cafés.

Nuevo Polanco is an area bordering Polanco to the north across Avenida Ejercito Nacional. It contains the Antara Polanco and Plaza Carso shopping malls, two new major museums, and many new residential towers.

Demographics 
The population of Polanco is 27,322, distributed as follows across the colonias:
 Zone I: 5,385
 Zone II: 4,943
 Zone III: 3,603
 Zone IV: 3,634
 Zone V: 9,757

Culture

Architecture
Polanco enjoyed a construction boom in the 1950s, when mansions and luxury apartment complexes were built. The style of construction of most mansions of this period is "Colonial Californiano", inspired by the Mission Revival Style in the Southwestern United States, with pseudo-baroque quarry windows, front-side gardens and inside halls. Some of these mansions have been renovated and converted into businesses and restaurants; many others have simply been torn down and replaced with new buildings.

Restaurants

Notable restaurants in Polanco include Pujol, Biko, Nobu, Morimoto, and Mr. Chow.

Frequently named as the best restaurant in Mexico, in 2022 Pujol ranked 5th in The World's 50 Best Restaurants.

Parks
Part of the city's iconic park, Chapultepec, falls within Polanco's borders. Parque Lincoln is a neighborhood park as are the smaller Parque América and Plaza Uruguay.

Museums
Polanco is walking distance from some of the city's most important museums in Chapultepec Park, such as the National Museum of Anthropology, the Soumaya Museum, the Modern Art Museum and Chapultepec Castle. Bordering Polanco on the north, in Nuevo Polanco are the Museo Soumaya and Museo Jumex.

Economy

In addition to the above-mentioned shopping and dining, Polanco and Nuevo Polanco together are one of the primary areas for Class A office space in the city and metro area. As of 2017 Polanco was the second fastest-growing area of new construction of office space. Samsung, Coca-Cola, Visa, GM, Nestlé, Telmex/Grupo Carso and many more multinationals have their headquarters in the middle of Polanco.

Shopping

Avenida Presidente Masaryk

The highest-priced street and the one with the most upscale boutiques in Latin America,  it is compared by some to Beverly Hills' Rodeo Drive or New York City's Fifth Avenue. The Avenue is named after the first President of Czechoslovakia Tomáš Masaryk.

Shops include Louis Vuitton, Cartier, Chanel, Corneliani, Salvatore Ferragamo, Tiffany & Co., DKNY, Ermenegildo Zegna, Brioni, Burberry, Bulgari, Chopard, Gucci, Hermès, Frette, Marc Jacobs, Max Mara, Hugo Boss, Rolex, Jaeger Le Coultre, Galerias Tehran, and Berger Joyeros.

Department stores
Polanco has a freestanding Liverpool department store, as well as the largest department store in Latin America, the flagship Palacio de Hierro store. The defunct París-Londres had a branch in Polanco.

Shopping centers
Shopping centers include:
 Pabellón Polanco, anchored by Sears and Cinemex cinemas
 Pasaje Polanco, originally called simply the Pasaje Comercial, a smaller but historic collection of shops around a courtyard, built in 1938 in Colonial Californiano style (Mexican interpretation of California Spanish Colonial Revival architecture)

Bordering Polanco in Nuevo Polanco are:
 Antara Fashion Hall, anchored by the Casa Palacio home store and Cinemex cinemas
 Plaza Carso, anchored by Saks Fifth Avenue and Cinépolis cinemas
 Galerías Polanco, anchored by West Elm
 Centro Comercial Polanco, anchored by Costco, Chedraui hypermarket and Cinemex cinemas
 Miyana, anchored by Soriana supermarket and Cinépolis VIP cinemas

Transportation
Polanco is bordered on the west by the Anillo Periférico ring road and the Avenida Río San Joaquín freeway is just to the north, connecting the Periférico via Polanco to central Mexico City. Main east-west thoroughfares include (south to north:) Paseo de la Reforma, Avenida Presidente Masaryk, Ave. Horacio, Ave. Homero, and Ave. Ejercito Nacional. Main north-south thoroughfares include (east to west): General Mariano Escobedo, Molière, Ferrocarril de Cuernavaca and Juan Vásquez Mella.

Public transit
Polanco is served by the Polanco and Auditorio stations of the Mexico City metro (subway). The western terminus of the double decker buses of the Reforma line of the Metrobús (bus rapid transit) is in Polanco. Peseros (minibuses), city buses and trolleybuses ply numerous streets in Polanco continuing to and from other parts of the city.

Education
Schools in Polanco include:
 Lycée Franco-Mexicain (Liceo Franco Mexicano)
 Colegio Ciudad de México Plantel Polanco
Conservatorio Nacional de Música

In popular culture
The mansion of The Exterminating Angel, the main setting of the 1962 Luis Buñuel film, is in Polanco. The address of the building is on Homero Avenue (formerly Rocafuerte Avenue), although it is no longer visible from street level as the mansion's former gardens are now occupied by high rise buildings.

Gallery

See also
Nuevo Polanco
Lomas de Chapultepec
List of most expensive streets by city
List of leading shopping streets and districts by city

References

External links

Polanco. Las transformaciones de un barrio. Rafael Fierro 

 
Central business districts
Financial districts in Mexico
Jewish communities in Mexico
Miguel Hidalgo, Mexico City
Neighborhoods in Mexico City
Edge cities in Mexico